Grabyo is a browser-based live video production suite integrated with other social media platforms such as Facebook, YouTube, Instagram, Snapchat, Twitter, and Periscope. Sports federations and media companies use cloud-based technology to produce professional-quality live streams and video clips for digital audiences.

The company produces and distributes live shows (such as sports or music events) and video clips (such as pre-match warm-ups, behind-the-scene activities, and instant highlights). For example, Grabyo's technology was used by Eurosport to publish over 9,000 social video clips during the winter Olympics. It is used to build digital fan bases, drive TV audiences and generate revenue from third-party sponsors and pay-TV subscriptions. It is benefiting from the rapid growth of video consumption through social platforms.

It is benefiting from the rapid growth of video consumption through social platforms. It was founded in 2013. Its customers include major sports rights owners and media companies such as La Liga, NHL, Eurosport, Sky Sports, FIFA World Cup, FIA Formula E Championship, The Championships, Wimbledon, the Premier League and Real Madrid C.F.

Grabyo ranked 77th in the Financial Times' FT 1000 Europe's Fastest Growing Companies 2018.

Investors

The company's investors include Oliver Slipper,  Nicole Junkermann, Cesc Fàbregas, Thierry Henry, Robin van Persie and Tony Parker.

References

External links
 Company home page
 Bloomberg TV interview of Grabyo CEO Gareth Capon

Real-time web
Social software
Mobile content
Companies established in 2013